This article lists all managers, caretaker managers and/or head coaches of Wolverhampton Wanderers Football Club since its foundation is 1877 until the present. Served by 31 different permanent managers throughout its history, three-quarters of them were born in the United Kingdom with the remaining quarter consisting of Norwegian Ståle Solbakken (2012–13), Italian Walter Zenga (2016), Portuguese duo Nuno Espírito Santo (2017–2021) and Bruno Lage (2021–2022) and current manager Julen Lopetegui (2022–), who is Spanish, coming from overseas.

From 1877 to 1922, the team was selected by a committee whose secretary had the same powers and role as a manager/head coach has today. There were two secretaries during this period, George Worrall and Jack Addenbrooke, the latter being the longest serving manager in the club's history. In 1922, the club broke from this tradition and appointed George Jobey as the first full-time manager.

The club's most successful manager is Stan Cullis, who won three league championships, two FA Cups and one FA Charity/Community Shield and was the first to bring continental football to the club during his 16-year reign from 1948 to 1964. Previously also a notable player for the club, he narrowly missed out on becoming the first manager to win the league-and-cup double in English football history, when Burnley pipped his FA Cup winning team, to the league title by a single point in 1960.

Bill McGarry and John Barnwell are the only managers since Cullis to have won major silverware, both winning the League Cup (in 1974 and 1980, respectively). The former also took the club to the debut UEFA Cup final in 1972, its best performance in a continental campaign.

Graham Turner achieved three trophies in two seasons in the late 1980s, with back-to-back divisional titles (the Third and Fourth Divisions) and the Football League Trophy (now the EFL Trophy). Turner's success bucked a downward trend for the club in the mid-1980s that saw three different managers preside over three successive relegations.

Dave Jones, Mick McCarthy and Nuno Espírito Santo have all since had promotion successes that took Wolves into the Premier League. Jones won the 2003 First Division play-offs and McCarthy and Espírito Santo both won the EFL Championship (the former in 2008–09 and the latter in 2017–18). Kenny Jackett also recorded a promotion success, winning Football League One (now EFL League One) as champions with a record points total of 103 in 2013–14.

Managers and head coaches
Information correct as of the end of 2022, midway through the 2022–23 season. Only competitive first-team matches in official competitions are counted.

Note: Win percentage is rounded to one decimal place.

References
 Manager History for Wolverhampton Wanderers at Soccerbase.com
 
 

Managers
 
Wolverhampton Wanderers